State Highway 45 (SH 45) is a State Highway in Kerala, India that starts from Capital city of Thiruvananthapuram and ends in #Vithura-  Ponmudi. The highway is 61 km long. This road passes through the town of Vithura in Trivandrum. [1]

Prime intersections 
Thiruvananthapuram -  Peroorkada- Nedumangad

- Chullimanoor  -  Vithura Town- Anappara - Kallar -Lower Sanatorium - Ponmudi upper Sanatorium

See also 
Roads in Kerala
List of State Highways in Kerala

References 

State Highways in Kerala
Roads in Thiruvananthapuram district